Lyric Suite for Sextet is an album by pianist Chick Corea and vibraphonist Gary Burton with a string quartet recorded in 1982 and released on the ECM label. The album is the third studio recording by the duo following Crystal Silence (1972) and Duet (1978).

Reception 
The AllMusic review by Dave Connolly awarded the album 2½ stars, stating: "If you enjoy jazz/classical hybrids, which are by their nature intellectual pursuits, than this music should pique your interest. However, better to think of this as a duet with some string support than a sextet of equal partners."

Track listing 
All compositions by Chick Corea
 "Part 1 - Overture" - 6:25   
 "Part 2 - Waltz" - 7:11   
 "Part 3 - Sketch (For Thelonious Monk)" - 2:13   
 "Part 4 - Roller Coaster" - 1:25   
 "Part 5 - Brasilia" - 7:57   
 "Part 6 - Dream" - 10:33   
 "Part 7 - Finale" - 3:54   
Recorded at Mad Hatter Studios in Los Angeles, California in September 1982

Personnel 
 Chick Corea – piano
 Gary Burton – vibraphone
 Ik-Hwan Bae – violin
 Carol Shrive – violin
 Karen Dreyfus – viola
 Fred Sherry – cello

References 

ECM Records albums
Gary Burton albums
Chick Corea albums
Albums produced by Manfred Eicher
1983 albums